Gene Abrams is an American mathematician and Professor of Mathematics at University of Colorado Colorado Springs. He works in the area of Algebra, and he earned his Ph.D. in mathematics at the University of Oregon in 1981.  Abrams' research interests are in noncommutative rings and their categories of modules, and he is known for his contributions to Morita equivalence, particularly Morita equivalence for nonunital rings.

Leavitt path algebras

Abrams is credited as one of the founders of the subject of Leavitt path algebras.  Leavitt path algebras were simultaneously introduced in 2005 by Abrams and Gonzalo Aranda Pino as well as by Ara, Moreno, and Pardo, with neither of the two groups aware of the other's work.  Abrams has stated that his inspiration for Leavitt path algebras came after attending a CBMS Conference hosted by Paul Muhly, David Pask, and Mark Tomforde at the University of Iowa in 2004.  The topic of this CBMS conference was graph C*-algebras, a particular class of C*-algebras studied in functional analysis, and the talks at the conference gave Abrams the idea to introduce Leavitt path algebras as algebraic analogues of the graph C*-algebras.  The Leavitt path algebras are so-named because they are constructed from the path algebra of a graph and they also generalize Leavitt algebras.

Leavitt path algebras have been investigated by dozens of mathematicians since their introduction, and Abrams has been instrumental in the development of the theory.  The study of Leavitt path algebras has also promoted interactions between Analysis and Algebra, and there have been multiple conference on Leavitt path algebras aimed at bringing algebraists and analysts together to collaborate and share ideas.  Abrams is also one of the coauthors, with Pere Ara and Mercedes Siles Molina, of the book Leavitt path algebras: a primer and handbook, published by Springer.  In 2020 Leavitt path algebras were added to the Mathematics Subject Classification with code 16S88 under the general discipline of Associative Rings and Algebras.

Outreach and popularization of mathematics
Abrams has been active in mathematics outreach and worked to popularize mathematical topics for general audiences.  He is a member and organizer of the Colorado Math Circle.  He has spoken at the Colorado Café Scientifique, an organization based on the French Café Philosophique, where members of the general public receive an 
introduction to an interesting current scientific topic from an expert.  Abrams also wrote an article for the MAA FOCUS describing his experiences at the Colorado Café Scientifique and encouraging more mathematicians to become involved in this kind of public outreach.

Abrams was awarded the Carl B. Allendoerfer Award of the Mathematical Association of America in 2011 for his paper with Jessica Sklar, The Graph Menagerie: Abstract Algebra and the Mad Veterinarian. The paper describes and provides a general solution to a topic in recreational math known as the "Mad veterinarian puzzles".  One example of a Mad Veterinarian Puzzle is the following:

Honors and awards
 Carl B. Allendoerfer Award, 2011
 Rocky Mountain Section of the Mathematical Association of America Award for Distinguished University Teaching, 2002
 University of Colorado systemwide President's Teaching Scholar, 1996

References

External links
Home page

20th-century American mathematicians
21st-century American mathematicians
Living people
Year of birth missing (living people)